"Callow-la-vita" is a song by British band Raymond Froggatt released as their debut single in April 1968. It was not successful in the UK, but became very successful in the Netherlands. It became more successful after being covered by the Dave Clark Five as "The Red Balloon".

In an interview in 1972, Raymond Froggatt said that the song "becoming such a massive hit was one of the worst things that ever happened", as "people still haven't forgotten about it. Now when we play colleges the kids still think we'll be doing that kind of stuff". By 1972, the song had been recorded by sixteen different artists and sold over three million worldwide sales.

Charts

The Dave Clark Five version

The Dave Clark Five's version was released in September 1968 and became a top-ten hit in several territories, including the UK. It was included on the UK album 5 by 5, but was not included on any US album.

Background and release
Dave Clark first heard "Callow-la-vita" on the radio and several weeks later contacted the publishers asking if they expected anything to become of the song, to which they said no. He then said that he would to cover the song so long as he could change the title, some of the lyrics and have a different arrangement. The publishers agreed and the Dave Clark Five recorded the song as "The Red Balloon". Recorded at Lansdowne Studios, the band were joined by trumpet session musicians, and the brass and saxophone arrangements were done by Les Reed. The lead vocals were by Dave Clark, which was the only Dave Clark Five single to do so. They were intended to be by usual lead singer Mike Smith, but "he couldn’t get to grips with it". The song also includes a verse in French, which had to be written down phonetically as Clark didn't speak the language and he later said "I didn’t know what the hell I was singing about until Top Of The Pops put a translation on screen". 

After the single's release, Polydor then re-released Raymond Froggatt's original version with the title "The Red Balloon".

Reception
Reviewing the Dave Clark Five version and the reissue of Raymond Froggatt's version for New Musical Express, Derek Johnson wrote that "it's an extremely catchy tune, with a lyrical, flowing quality and the Froggatt team treats it with a delicacy and piquancy ideally suited to the subject matter". Whereas, Johnson wrote that "Dave Clark's version is entirely different. He has reverted to his big-bash, drum-thumping style of "Glad All Over"", and that it is "easily the more commercial of the two and the more likely to achieve Chart status".

Personnel
 Dave Clark – lead vocals, drums
 Mike Smith – organ, backing vocals
 Lenny Davidson – guitar, backing vocals
 Rick Huxley – bass guitar, backing vocals
 Denis Payton – sousaphone
 Stan Roderick – trumpet
 Bert Ezard – trumpet
 Eddie Blair – trumpet

Charts

Other cover versions
 In November 1968, French singer Marie Laforêt released a French-language cover of the song, titled "Que calor la vida", which peaked at number 2 in France and number 14 in the Walloon region of Belgium.

References

1968 singles
The Dave Clark Five songs
1968 songs
Polydor Records singles
Columbia Graphophone Company singles